Super Dirt Week is a modified racing event held annually on Columbus Day weekend in Central New York state.

History

The first event was scheduled over three days, from September 29, through October 1, 1972 at the New York State Fairgrounds.  Inspection and qualifying races were conducted on Friday and Saturday, and the Championship race was held on Sunday.

In 1976 a fourth day was added to the schedule, and a 100 mile race the USAC Champ Cars was held on Saturday October 2.   The date of the event was eventually changed to Columbus Day weekend, and expanded to 6 days and championships for 5 car classes. The Syracuse Mile remained the featured race track until 2015, and companion races were added over the week at the nearby race tracks in Elbridge, Weedsport, and Brewerton.

After the 2015 event the grandstands at the Syracuse Mile were torn down, with  Oswego Speedway hosting the primary races.

Media coverage

The event was first televised live on ESPN in 1980. During the next 35 years, broadcast rights went to TNN, the Empire Sports Net, SPEED, and most recently, to CBS Sports Network.

References

External links
Super Dirt Week

Motorsport competitions in New York (state)
1972 establishments in New York (state)
Dirt track racing in the United States
Recurring sporting events established in 1972
Annual sporting events in the United States
Stock car racing